Valentine's Day, also called Saint Valentine's Day or the Feast of Saint Valentine, is celebrated annually on February 14. It originated as a Christian feast day honoring a martyr named Valentine and through later folk traditions, it has also become a significant cultural, religious and commercial celebration of romance and love in many regions of the world.

There are a number of martyrdom stories associated with various Saint Valentines connected to February 14, including an account of the imprisonment of Saint Valentine of Rome for ministering to Christians persecuted under the Roman Empire in the third century. According to an early tradition, Saint Valentine restored sight to the blind daughter of his jailer. Numerous later additions to the legend have better related it to the theme of love: tradition maintains that Saint Valentine performed weddings for Christian soldiers who were forbidden to marry by the Roman emperor; an 18th-century embellishment to the legend claims he wrote the jailer's daughter a letter signed "Your Valentine" as a farewell before his execution;

The 8th-century Gelasian Sacramentary recorded the celebration of the Feast of Saint Valentine on February 14. The day became associated with romantic love in the 14th and 15th centuries when notions of courtly love flourished, apparently by association with the "lovebirds" of early spring. In 18th-century England, it grew into an occasion for couples to express their love for each other by presenting flowers, offering confectionery, and sending greeting cards (known as "valentines"). Valentine's Day symbols that are used today include the heart-shaped outline, doves, and the figure of the winged Cupid. In the 19th century, handmade cards gave way to mass-produced greetings. In Italy, Saint Valentine's keys are given to lovers "as a romantic symbol and an invitation to unlock the giver's heart", as well as to children to ward off epilepsy (called Saint Valentine's Malady).

Saint Valentine's Day is not a public holiday in any country, although it is an official feast day in the Anglican Communion and the Lutheran Church. Many parts of the Eastern Orthodox Church also celebrate Saint Valentine's Day on July 6 in honor of Roman presbyter Saint Valentine, and on July 30 in honor of Hieromartyr Valentine, the Bishop of Interamna (modern Terni).

Saint Valentine

History

Numerous early Christian martyrs were named Valentine. The Valentines honored on February 14 are Valentine of Rome (Valentinus presb. m. Romae) and Valentine of Terni (Valentinus ep. Interamnensis m. Romae). Valentine of Rome was a priest in Rome who was martyred in 269 and was added to the calendar of saints by Pope Gelasius I in 496 and was buried on the Via Flaminia. The relics of St. Valentine were kept in the Church and Catacombs of San Valentino in Rome, which "remained an important pilgrim site throughout the Middle Ages until the relics of St. Valentine were transferred to the church of Santa Prassede during the pontificate of Nicholas IV [1288 - 1292]". The flower-crowned skull of Saint Valentine is exhibited in the Basilica of Santa Maria in Cosmedin, Rome. Other relics are found at Whitefriar Street Carmelite Church in Dublin, Ireland.

Valentine of Terni became bishop of Interamna (now Terni, in central Italy) and is said to have been martyred during the persecution under Emperor Aurelian in 273. He is buried on the Via Flaminia, but in a different location from Valentine of Rome. His relics are at the Basilica of Saint Valentine in Terni (Basilica di San Valentino). Professor Jack B. Oruch of the University of Kansas notes that "abstracts of the acts of the two saints were in nearly every church and monastery of Europe." A relic claimed to be Saint Valentine of Terni's head was preserved in the abbey of New Minster, Winchester, and venerated.

The Catholic Encyclopedia speaks of a third saint named Valentine who was mentioned in early martyrologies under date of February 14. He was martyred in Africa with a number of companions, but nothing more is known about him. 

February 14 is celebrated as St. Valentine's Day in various Christian denominations; it has, for example, the rank of 'commemoration' in the calendar of saints in the Anglican Communion. The feast day of Saint Valentine is given in the calendar of saints of the Lutheran Church. In the 1969 revision of the Roman Catholic Calendar of Saints, the feast day of Saint Valentine on February 14 was relegated from the General Roman Calendar to particular (local or even national) calendars for the following reason: "Though the memorial of Saint Valentine is ancient, it is left to particular calendars, since, apart from his name, nothing is known of Saint Valentine except that he was buried on the Via Flaminia on February 14." Therefore, as he remains within the Roman Martyrology, he may recognised optionally during mass outside of Christmastide and Eastertide.

The feast day is still celebrated in Balzan (Malta) where relics of the saint are claimed to be found, and also throughout the world by Traditionalist Catholics who follow the older, pre-Second Vatican Council calendar (see General Roman Calendar of 1960).

In the Eastern Orthodox Church, St. Valentine is recognized on July 6, in which Saint Valentine, the Roman presbyter, is honoured; in addition, the Eastern Orthodox Church observes the feast of Hieromartyr Valentine, Bishop of Interamna, on July 30.

Legends 

J.C. Cooper, in The Dictionary of Christianity, writes that Saint Valentine was "a priest of Rome who was imprisoned for succouring persecuted Christians." Contemporary records of Saint Valentine were most probably destroyed during this Diocletianic Persecution in the early 4th century. In the 5th or 6th century, a work called Passio Marii et Marthae published a story of martyrdom for Saint Valentine of Rome, perhaps by borrowing tortures that happened to other saints, as was usual in the literature of that period.

The same events are found in Bede's Martyrology, which was compiled in the 8th century. It states that Saint Valentine was persecuted as a Christian and interrogated by Roman Emperor Claudius II in person. Claudius was impressed by Valentine and had a discussion with him, attempting to get him to convert to Roman paganism in order to save his life. Valentine refused and tried to convert Claudius to Christianity instead. Because of this, he was executed. Before his execution, he is reported to have performed a miracle by healing Julia, the blind daughter of his jailer Asterius. The jailer's daughter and his forty-six member household, family members and servants, came to believe in Jesus and were baptized.

A later Passio repeated the legend, adding that Pope Julius I built a church over his sepulchre (it is a confusion with a 4th-century tribune called Valentino who donated land to build a church at a time when Julius was a Pope). The legend was picked up as fact by later martyrologies, starting with Bede's martyrology in the 8th century. It was repeated in the 13th century, in The Golden Legend.

There is an additional embellishment to The Golden Legend, which according to Henry Ansgar Kelly, was added in the 18th century and widely repeated. On the evening before Valentine was to be executed, he is supposed to have written the first "valentine" card himself, addressed to the daughter of his jailer Asterius, who was no longer blind, signing as "Your Valentine." The expression "From your Valentine" was later adopted by modern Valentine letters. This legend has been published by both American Greetings and The History Channel.

John Foxe, a Sixteenth Century English historian, and the Order of Carmelites state that Saint Valentine was buried in the Church of Praxedes in Rome, located near the cemetery of Saint Hippolytus. This order says that according to legend, "Julia herself planted a pink-blossomed almond tree near his grave. Today, the almond tree remains a symbol of abiding love and friendship."

Another embellishment suggests that Saint Valentine performed clandestine Christian weddings for soldiers who were forbidden to marry. The Roman Emperor Claudius II supposedly forbade this in order to grow his army, believing that married men did not make for good soldiers. However, George Monger writes that this marriage ban was never issued and that Claudius II told his soldiers to take two or three women for themselves after his victory over the Goths.

According to legend, in order "to remind these men of their vows and God's love, Saint Valentine is said to have cut hearts from parchment", giving them to these soldiers and persecuted Christians, a possible origin of the widespread use of hearts on St. Valentine's Day.

Saint Valentine supposedly wore a purple amethyst ring, customarily worn on the hands of Christian bishops with an image of Cupid engraved in it, a recognizable symbol associated with love that was legal under the Roman Empire; Roman soldiers would recognize the ring and ask him to perform marriage for them. Probably due to the association with Saint Valentine, amethyst has become the birthstone of February, which is thought to attract love.

Folk traditions
While the European folk traditions connected with Saint Valentine and St. Valentine's Day have become marginalized by modern customs connecting the day with romantic love, there are still some connections with the advent of spring.

While the custom of sending cards, flowers, chocolates and other gifts originated in the UK, Valentine's Day still remains connected with various regional customs in England. In Norfolk, a character called 'Jack' Valentine knocks on the rear door of houses leaving sweets and presents for children. Although he was leaving treats, many children were scared of this mystical person.

In Slovenia, Saint Valentine or Zdravko was one of the saints of spring, the saint of good health and the patron of beekeepers and pilgrims.
A proverb says that "Saint Valentine brings the keys of roots". Plants and flowers start to grow on this day. It has been celebrated as the day when the first work in the vineyards and in the fields commences. It is also said that birds propose to each other or marry on that day. Another proverb says "Valentin – prvi spomladin" ("Valentine – the first spring saint"), as in some places (especially White Carniola), Saint Valentine marks the beginning of spring. Valentine's Day has only recently been celebrated as the day of love. The day of love was traditionally March 12, the Saint Gregory's day, or February 22, Saint Vincent's Day. The patron of love was Saint Anthony, whose day has been celebrated on June 13.

Connection with romantic love

Possible ancient origins 

The "Feast" (Latin: "in natali", lit.: on the birthday) of Saint Valentine originated in Christendom and has been marked by the Western Church of Christendom in honour of one of the Christian martyrs named Valentine, as recorded in the 8th century Gelasian Sacramentary. In Ancient Rome, Lupercalia was observed February 13–15 on behalf of Pan & Juno, pagan gods of love, marriage & fertility. It was a rite connected to purification and health, and had only slight connection to fertility (as a part of health) and none to love. The celebration of Saint Valentine is not known to have had any romantic connotations until Chaucer's poetry about "Valentine's Day" in the 14th century, some seven hundred years after celebration of Lupercalia is believed to have ceased. 

Lupercalia was a festival local to the city of Rome. The more general Festival of Juno Februa, meaning "Juno the purifier" or "the chaste Juno", was celebrated on February 13–14. Although the Pope Gelasius I (492–496) article in the Catholic Encyclopedia says that he abolished Lupercalia, theologian and Methodist minister Bruce Forbes wrote that "no evidence" has been demonstrated to link St. Valentine's Day and the rites of the ancient Roman purification festival of Lupercalia, despite claims by many authors to the contrary.

Some researchers have theorized that Gelasius I replaced Lupercalia with the celebration of the Purification of the Blessed Virgin Mary and claim a connection to the 14th century's connotations of romantic love, but there is no historical indication that he ever intended such a thing. Also, the dates do not fit because at the time of Gelasius I, the feast was only celebrated in Jerusalem, and it was on February 14 only because Jerusalem placed the Nativity of Jesus (Christmas) on January 6. Although it was called "Purification of the Blessed Virgin Mary", it also dealt with the presentation of Jesus at the temple. Jerusalem's Purification of the Blessed Virgin Mary on February 14 became the Presentation of Jesus at the Temple on February 2 as it was introduced to Rome and other places in the sixth century, after Gelasius I's time.

Alban Butler in his The Lives of the Fathers, Martyrs, and Other Principal Saints (1756–1759) claimed without proof that boys and girls in Lupercalia drew names from a jar to make couples, and that modern Valentine's letters originated from this custom. In reality, this practice originated in the Middle Ages, with no link to Lupercalia, with boys drawing the names of girls at random to couple with them. This custom was combated by priests, for example by Frances de Sales around 1600, apparently by replacing it with a religious custom of girls drawing the names of apostles from the altar. However, this religious custom is recorded as early as the 13th century in the life of Saint Elizabeth of Hungary, so it could have a different origin.

Chaucer's Parliament of Fowls

The first recorded association of Valentine's Day with romantic love is believed to be in the Parliament of Fowls (1382) by Geoffrey Chaucer, a dream vision portraying a parliament for birds to choose their mates. Honouring the first anniversary of the engagement of fifteen-year-old King Richard II of England to fifteen-year-old Anne of Bohemia, Chaucer wrote (in Middle English):

""The Riverside Chaucer, ed. Larry D. Benson, Oxford University Press, 1987, p. 389, lines 309-315.

In modern English:
"For this was on Saint Valentine's DayWhen every bird comes there to choose his matchOf every kind that men may think ofAnd that so huge a noise they began to makeThat earth and air and tree and every lakeWas so full, that not easily was there spaceFor me to stand—so full was all the place."

Readers have uncritically assumed that Chaucer was referring to February 14 as Valentine's Day. Henry Ansgar Kelly has observed that Chaucer might have had in mind the feast day of St. Valentine of Genoa, an early bishop of Genoa who died around AD 307; it was probably celebrated on 3 May. A treaty providing for Richard II and Anne's marriage, the subject of the poem, was signed on May 2, 1381.

Jack B. Oruch notes that the date on which spring begins has changed since Chaucer's time because of the precession of the equinoxes and the introduction of the more accurate Gregorian calendar only in 1582. On the Julian calendar in use in Chaucer's time, February 14 would have fallen on the date now called February 23, a time when some birds have started mating and nesting in England.

Chaucer's Parliament of Fowls refers to a supposedly established tradition, but there is no record of such a tradition before Chaucer. The speculative derivation of sentimental customs from the distant past began with 18th-century antiquaries, notably Alban Butler, the author of Butler's Lives of Saints, and have been perpetuated even by respectable modern scholars. Most notably, "the idea that Valentine's Day customs perpetuated those of the Roman Lupercalia has been accepted uncritically and repeated, in various forms, up to the present".

Three other authors who made poems about birds mating on St. Valentine's Day around the same years: Otton de Grandson from Savoy, John Gower from England, and a knight called Pardo from Valencia. Chaucer most probably predated all of them; but due to the difficulty of dating medieval works, it is not possible to ascertain which of the four may have influenced the others.

Court of love 
The earliest description of February 14 as an annual celebration of love appears in the Charter of the Court of Love. The charter, allegedly issued by Charles VI of France at Mantes-la-Jolie in 1400, describes lavish festivities to be attended by several members of the royal court, including a feast, amorous song and poetry competitions, jousting and dancing. Amid these festivities, the attending ladies would hear and rule on disputes from lovers. No other record of the court exists, and none of those named in the charter were present at Mantes except Charles's queen, Isabeau of Bavaria, who may well have imagined it all while waiting out a plague.

Valentine poetry
The earliest surviving valentine is a 15th-century rondeau written by Charles, Duke of Orléans to his wife, which commences.
 At the time, the duke was being held in the Tower of London following his capture at the Battle of Agincourt, 1415.

The earliest surviving valentines in English appear to be those in the Paston Letters, written in 1477 by Margery Brewes to her future husband John Paston "my right well-beloved Valentine".

Valentine's Day is mentioned ruefully by Ophelia in William Shakespeare's Hamlet (1600–1601):

John Donne used the legend of the marriage of the birds as the starting point for his epithalamion celebrating the marriage of Elizabeth, daughter of James I of England, and Frederick V, Elector Palatine, on Valentine's Day:

The verse "Roses are red" echoes conventions traceable as far back as Edmund Spenser's epic The Faerie Queene (1590):

"She bath'd with roses red, and violets blew,
And all the sweetest , that in the forrest grew."

The modern cliché Valentine's Day poem can be found in Gammer Gurton's Garland (1784), a collection of English nursery rhymes published in London by Joseph Johnson:

"The rose is red, the violet's blue,
The honey's sweet, and so are you.
Thou art my love and I am thine;
I drew thee to my Valentine:
The lot was cast and then I drew,
And Fortune said it shou'd be you."Gammer Gurton's Garland, original 1810 version. Also 1810 version reprinted in 1866   that uses more modern grammar like "should" instead of "shou'd".

Modern times 

In 1797, a British publisher issued The Young Man's Valentine Writer, which contained scores of suggested sentimental verses for the young lover unable to compose his own. Printers had already begun producing a limited number of cards with verses and sketches, called "mechanical valentines". Paper Valentines became so popular in England in the early 19th century that they were assembled in factories. Fancy Valentines were made with real lace and ribbons, with paper lace introduced in the mid-19th century. In 1835, 60,000 Valentine cards were sent by post in the United Kingdom, despite postage being expensive.

A reduction in postal rates following Sir Rowland Hill's postal reforms with the 1840 invention of the postage stamp (Penny Black) saw the number of Valentines posted increase, with 400,000 sent just one year after its invention, and ushered in the less personal but easier practice of mailing Valentines. That made it possible for the first time to exchange cards anonymously, which is taken as the reason for the sudden appearance of racy verse in an era otherwise prudishly Victorian. Production increased, "Cupid's Manufactory" as Charles Dickens termed it, with over 3,000 women employed in manufacturing. The Laura Seddon Greeting Card Collection at Manchester Metropolitan University gathers 450 Valentine's Day cards dating from early nineteenth century Britain, printed by the major publishers of the day. The collection appears in Seddon's book Victorian Valentines (1996).

In the United States, the first mass-produced Valentines of embossed paper lace were produced and sold shortly after 1847 by Esther Howland (1828–1904) of Worcester, Massachusetts. Her father operated a large book and stationery store, but Howland took her inspiration from an English Valentine she had received from a business associate of her father. Intrigued with the idea of making similar Valentines, Howland began her business by importing paper lace and floral decorations from England. 

A writer in Graham's American Monthly observed in 1849, "Saint Valentine's Day ... is becoming, nay it has become, a national holyday." The English practice of sending Valentine's cards was established enough to feature as a plot device in Elizabeth Gaskell's Mr. Harrison's Confessions (1851): "I burst in with my explanations: 'The valentine I know nothing about.' 'It is in your handwriting', said he coldly." Since 2001, the Greeting Card Association has been giving an annual "Esther Howland Award for a Greeting Card Visionary".

Since the 19th century, handmade cards have given way to mass-produced greeting cards. In the UK, just under half of the population spend money on their Valentines, and around £1.9 billion was spent in 2015 on cards, flowers, chocolates, and other gifts. The mid-19th century Valentine's Day trade was a harbinger of further commercialized holidays in the U.S. to follow.

In 1868, the British chocolate company Cadbury created Fancy Boxes – a decorated box of chocolates – in the shape of a heart for Valentine's Day. Boxes of filled chocolates quickly became associated with the holiday. In the second half of the 20th century, the practice of exchanging cards was extended to all manner of gifts, such as giving jewelry.

The U.S. Greeting Card Association estimates that approximately 190 million valentines are sent each year in the US. Half of those valentines are given to family members other than husband or wife, usually to children. When the valentine-exchange cards made in school activities are included the figure goes up to 1 billion, and teachers become the people receiving the most valentines. The average valentine's spending has increased every year in the U.S, from $108 a person in 2010 to $131 in 2013.

The rise of Internet popularity at the turn of the millennium is creating new traditions. Millions of people use, every year, digital means of creating and sending Valentine's Day greeting messages such as e-cards, love coupons or printable greeting cards. Valentine's Day is considered by some to be a Hallmark holiday due to its commercialization.

In the modern era, liturgically, the Lutheran Church and Anglican Church have a service for St. Valentine's Day (the Feast of St. Valentine), which includes the optional rite of the renewal of marriage vows. In 2016, the Catholic Bishops of England and Wales established a novena prayer "to support single people seeking a spouse ahead of St Valentine's Day."

Celebration and status worldwide

Valentine's Day customs – sending greeting cards (known as "valentines"), offering confectionery and presenting flowers – developed in early modern England and spread throughout the English-speaking world in the 19th century. In the later 20th and early 21st centuries, these customs spread to other countries, like those of Halloween, or aspects of Christmas (such as Santa Claus).

Valentine's Day is celebrated in many East Asian countries with Singaporeans, Chinese and South Koreans spending the most money on Valentine's gifts.

Americas

Latin America
It is also common to see people perform "acts of appreciation" for their friends.

Some countries, in particular the Dominican Republic and El Salvador, have a tradition called  ("Secret friend"), which is a game similar to the Christmas tradition of Secret Santa.

Brazil

In Brazil, the Dia dos Namorados (lit. "Lovers' Day", or "Boyfriends'/Girlfriends' Day") is celebrated on June 12, probably because that is the day before Saint Anthony's day, known there as the 'marriage saint', when traditionally many single women perform popular rituals, called simpatias, in order to find a good husband or boyfriend. Couples exchange gifts, chocolates, cards, and flower bouquets. The February 14 Valentine's Day is not celebrated at all because it is usually too close to Brazilian Carnival, which can fall anywhere from early February to early March and lasts almost a week.

Colombia
Colombia celebrates Día del amor y la amistad on the third Saturday in September instead. Amigo Secreto is also popular there.

United States

On the United States mainland, about 190 million Valentine's Day cards are sent each year, not including the hundreds of millions of cards school children exchange.

Valentine's Day is a major source of economic activity, with total expenditures in 2017 topping $18.2 billion in 2017, or over $136 per person. This is an increase from $108 per person in 2010. In 2019, a survey by the National Retail Federation found that over the previous decade, the percentage of people who celebrate Valentine's Day had declined steadily. From their survey results, they found three primary reasons: over-commercialization of the holiday, not having a significant other, and not being interested in celebrating it.

Asia

Afghanistan 
In pre-Taliban years, Koch-e-Gul-Faroushi (Flower Street) in downtown Kabul used to be adorned with innovative flower arrangements, to attract the Valentine's Day-celebrating youth. In the Afghan tradition, love is often expressed through poetry. A new generation of budding poets such as Ramin Mazhar and Mahtab Sahel express themselves through poetry using Valentine's Day as a theme, to voice concerns about the erosion of freedoms. In their political commentary they defy fear by saying 'I kiss you amid the Taliban'.

Bangladesh 

Valentine's Day was first celebrated in Bangladesh by Shafik Rehman, a journalist and editor of Jaijaidin in 1993. He was acquainted with Western culture by studying in London. He highlighted Valentine's Day to the Bangladeshi people through Jaijaidin newspaper. Rehman is called the "father of Valentine's Day in Bangladesh". On this day, people in various bonds including lovers, friends, husbands and wives, mothers and children, students and teachers express their love for each other with flowers, chocolates, cards and other gifts. On this day, various parks and recreation centers of the country are full of people of love. No public holiday is declared on this day in Bangladesh.

Some in Bangladesh feel that celebrating this day is not acceptable from a cultural and Islamic point of view. Before the celebration of Valentine's Day, February 14 was celebrated as the anti-authoritarian day in Bangladesh. However, that day is disregarded by people to celebrate Valentine's Day.

China

In Chinese, Valentine's Day is called lovers' festival (Mandarin: Qīng Rén Jié; Hokkien: Chêng Lîn Chiat; Cantonese: Chìhng Yàhn Jit; Shanghainese Xin Yin Jiq). The "Chinese Valentine's Day" is the Qixi Festival (meaning "The Night of Sevens"), celebrated on the seventh day of the seventh month of the lunar calendar. According to the legend, the Cowherd star and the Weaver Maid star are normally separated by the Milky Way (silvery river) but are allowed to meet by crossing it on the 7th day of the 7th month of the Chinese calendar.

In recent years, celebrating White Day has also become fashionable among some young people.

India

In ancient India, there was a tradition of adoring Kamadeva, the lord of love – exemplified by the erotic carvings in the Khajuraho Group of Monuments and by the writing of the Kamasutra. This tradition was lost around the Middle Ages, when Kamadeva was no longer celebrated, and public displays of sexual affection became frowned upon. This repression of public affections began to loosen in the 1990s.

Valentine's Day celebrations did not catch on in India until around 1992. It was spread due to the programs in commercial TV channels, such as MTV, dedicated radio programs, and love letter competitions, in addition to an economical liberalization that allowed the explosion of the valentine card industry. The celebration has caused a sharp change on how people have been displaying their affection in public since the Middle Ages.

On a 2018 online survey, it was found that 68% of the respondents do not wish to celebrate Valentine's Day. It can be also observed that different religious groups, including Hindu, Muslim and Christian people of India do not support Valentine's Day.

In modern times, Hindu and Islamic traditionalists have considered the holiday to be cultural contamination from the West, a result of globalization in India. Shiv Sena and the Sangh Parivar have asked their followers to shun the holiday and the "public admission of love" because of them being "alien to Indian culture". Although these protests are organized by political elites, the protesters themselves are middle-class Hindu men who fear that the globalization will destroy the traditions in their society: arranged marriages, Hindu joint families, full-time mothers, etc. Despite these obstacles, Valentine's Day is becoming increasingly popular in India.

Valentine's Day has been strongly criticized from a postcolonial perspective by intellectuals from the Indian left. The holiday is regarded as a front for "Western imperialism", "neocolonialism", and "the exploitation of working classes through commercialism by multinational corporations". It is claimed that as a result of Valentine's Day, the working classes and rural poor become more disconnected socially, politically, and geographically from the hegemonic capitalist power structure. They also criticize mainstream media attacks on Indians opposed to Valentine's Day as a form of demonization that is designed and derived to further the Valentine's Day agenda.
Right wing Hindu nationalists are also hostile. In February 2012, Subash Chouhan of the Bajrang Dal warned couples that "They cannot kiss or hug in public places. Our activists will beat them up".
He said "We are not against love, but we criticize vulgar exhibition of love at public places".

According to The Hindu in February 2023, the Animal Welfare Board of India appealed to Indians to celebrate 14th February as "Cow Hug Day" for "emotional richness" and to increase "individual and collective happiness."  The newspaper referenced the sacredness of cows as being equivalent to one's mother in Indian culture, and further rued ".. Vedic traditions are almost on the verge of extinction due to the progress of western culture over time. The dazzle of western civilization has made our physical culture and heritage almost forgotten". According Rhea Mogul of CNN, a 2017 photo series Indian women sporting cow masks by activist Sujatro Ghosh portrays a society in which cows are more valued than women. Mogul says authorities had advanced the idea to rebrand Valentine's Day as "Cow Hug Day". Mogul says, "But the move seems to have failed and later retracted after it prompted a rush of internet memes, cartoons and jokes by TV hosts about the importance of consent." Media outlets like NDTV mocked the government's plan by underlining the importance of the consent of cows before hugging them. Mogul says critics say cow-worship has been politically manipulated by cow vigilante motivated by conservative BJP's majoritarian politics to harass minorities with allegations of disrespect of cows or cow slaughter.

Iran

The history of Valentine's Day in Iran dates back to the Qajar era of the latter half of the 19th century – Naser al-Din Shah Qajar did not take his wife with him during his trip to Europe and he sent her a greeting card from distance on Valentine's Day. This greeting card is available in Iranian museums. 

Since the mid-2000s, Valentine's Day has become increasingly popular in Iran, especially among young people. However, it has also been the subject of heavy criticism from Iranian conservatives, who see it as part of the spread of "decadent" Western culture. Since 2011, authorities have attempted to discourage celebrations and impose restrictions on the sale and production of Valentine's Day-related goods, although the holiday remains popular as of 2018. Additionally, there have been efforts to revive the ancient Persian festival of Sepandārmazgān, which takes place around the same time, to replace Valentine's Day, although, as of 2016, this has also been largely unsuccessful.

Israel
In Israel, the Jewish tradition of Tu B'Av has been revived and transformed into the Jewish equivalent of Valentine's Day. It is celebrated on the 15th day of the month of Av (usually in late August). In ancient times girls would wear white dresses and dance in the vineyards, where the boys would be waiting for them (Mishna Taanith end of Chapter 4). Today, Tu B'Av is celebrated as a second holiday of love by secular people (along with Valentine's Day), and it shares many of the customs associated with Saint Valentine's Day in western societies. In modern Israeli culture Tu B'Av is a popular day to proclaim love, propose marriage, and give gifts like cards or flowers.

Japan
In Japan, Morozoff Ltd. introduced the holiday for the first time in 1936, when it ran an advertisement aimed at foreigners. Later, in 1953, it began promoting the giving of heart-shaped chocolates; other Japanese confectionery companies followed suit thereafter. In 1958, the Isetan department store ran a "Valentine sale". Further campaigns during the 1960s popularized the custom.

The custom that only women give chocolates to men may have originated from the translation error of a chocolate-company executive during the initial campaigns. In particular, office ladies give chocolate to their co-workers. Unlike western countries, gifts such as greeting cards, candies, flowers, or dinner dates are uncommon, and most of the gifts-related activity is about giving the right amount of chocolate to each person. Japanese chocolate companies make half their annual sales during this time of the year.

Many women feel obliged to give chocolates to all male co-workers, except when the day falls on a Sunday, a holiday.

In the 1980s, the Japanese National Confectionery Industry Association launched a successful campaign to make March 14 a "reply day", where men are expected to return the favour to those who gave them chocolates on Valentine's Day, calling it White Day for the color of the chocolates being offered. A previous failed attempt to popularize this celebration had been done by a marshmallow manufacturer who wanted men to return marshmallows to women.

In Japan, the romantic "date night" associated with Valentine's Day is celebrated on Christmas Eve.

Lebanon 

Saint Valentine is the patron saint for a large part of the Lebanese population. Couples take the opportunity of Valentine's feast day to exchange sweet words and gifts as proof of love. Such gifts typically include boxes of chocolates, cupcakes, and red roses, which are considered the emblem of sacrifice and passion.

Lebanese people celebrate Valentine's Day in a different way in every city. In Beirut, men take women out to dine and may buy them a gift. Many women are asked to marry on that day. In Sidon, Valentine's Day is celebrated with the whole family – it is more about family love than a couple's love.

Malaysia 
Islamic officials in West Malaysia warned Muslims against celebrating Valentine's Day, linking it with vice activities. Deputy Prime Minister Muhyiddin Yassin said the celebration of romantic love was "not suitable" for Muslims. Wan Mohamad Sheikh Abdul Aziz, head of the Malaysian Islamic Development Department (Jakim), which oversees the country's Islamic policies said that a fatwa (ruling) issued by the country's top clerics in 2005 noted that the day 'is associated with elements of Christianity,' and 'we just cannot get involved with other religions' worshipping rituals.' Jakim officials planned to carry out a nationwide campaign called "Awas Jerat Valentine's Day" ("Mind the Valentine's Day Trap"), aimed at preventing Muslims from celebrating the day on February 14, 2011. Activities include conducting raids in hotels to stop young couples from having unlawful sex and distributing leaflets to Muslim university students warning them against the day.

On Valentine's Day 2011, West Malaysian religious authorities arrested more than 100 Muslim couples concerning the celebration ban. Some of them would be charged in the Shariah Court for defying the department's ban against the celebration of Valentine's Day.

In East Malaysia, the celebration are much more tolerated among young Muslim couples although some Islamic officials and Muslim activists from the West side have told younger generations to refrain from such celebration by organising da'wah and tried to spread their ban into the East. In both the states of Sabah and Sarawak, the celebration is usually common with flowers.

Pakistan 

The concept of Valentine's Day was introduced into Pakistan during the late 1990s with special TV and radio programs. The Jamaat-e-Islami political party has called for the banning of Valentine's Day celebration. Despite this, the celebration is becoming popular among urban youth and the florists expect to sell a great number of flowers, especially red roses. The case is the same with card publishers.

In 2016, the local governing body of Peshwar officially banned the celebration of Valentine's Day in the city. The ban was also implemented in other cities such as Kohat by the local governments.

In 2017, the Islamabad High Court banned Valentine's Day celebrations in public places in Pakistan. More than 80% of Dawn readers polled on its website agreed with this decision.

In 2018, because of a petition by a citizen, Abdul Waheed, the Pakistan Electronic Media Regulatory Authority advised broadcasters and newspapers against airing any Valentine's Day celebrations.

Philippines
In the Philippines, Valentine's Day is called Araw ng mga Puso in much the same manner as in the West. It is usually marked by a steep increase in the price of flowers, particularly red roses. It is the most popular day for weddings, with some localities offering mass ceremonies for no charge.

Saudi Arabia
In Saudi Arabia, in 2002 and 2008, religious police banned the sale of all Valentine's Day items, telling shop workers to remove any red items, because the day is considered a Christian holiday. This ban has created a black market for roses and wrapping paper. In 2012, the religious police arrested more than 140 Muslims for celebrating the holiday, and confiscated all red roses from flower shops. Muslims are not allowed to celebrate the holiday, and non-Muslims can celebrate only behind closed doors.

"Saudi cleric Sheikh Muhammad Al-'Arifi said on Valentine's Day Eve that celebrating this holiday constitutes bid'a – a forbidden innovation and deviation from religious law and custom – and mimicry of the West."

However, in 2017 and 2018, after a fatwa was widely circulated, the religious police did not prevent Muslims from celebrating the day. In 2018, Sheikh Ahmed Qasim Al-Ghamdi, a Saudi cleric and former president of the Committee for the Promotion of Virtue and Prevention of Vice, said that Valentine's Day is not haram and is compatible with Islamic values.

Singapore
According to findings, Singaporeans are among the biggest spenders on Valentine's Day, with 60% of Singaporeans indicating that they would spend between $100 and $500 during the season leading up to the holiday.

South Korea
In South Korea, women give chocolate to men on February 14, and men give non-chocolate candy to women on March 14 (White Day). On April 14 (Black Day), those who did not receive anything on February or March 14 go to a Chinese-Korean restaurant to eat black noodles (짜장면 jajangmyeon) and lament their 'single life'. Koreans also celebrate Pepero Day on November 11, when young couples give each other Pepero cookies. The date '11/11' is intended to resemble the long shape of the cookie. The 14th of every month marks a love-related day in Korea, although most of them are obscure. From January to December: Candle Day, Valentine's Day, White Day, Black Day, Rose Day, Kiss Day, Silver Day, Green Day, Music Day, Wine Day, Movie Day, and Hug Day. Korean women give a much higher amount of chocolate than Japanese women.

Taiwan

In Taiwan, traditional Qixi Festival, Valentine's Day and White Day are all celebrated. However, the situation is the reverse of Japan's. Men give gifts to women on Valentine's Day, and women return them on White Day.

Europe

Estonia and Finland
In Finland, Valentine's Day is called , which means "Friend's Day". As the name indicates, this day is more about remembering friends, not significant others. In Estonia, Valentine's Day was originally called  and later also  ('Friend's Day') as a calque of the Finnish term.

France
In France, a traditionally Catholic country, Valentine's Day is known simply as "Saint Valentin", and is celebrated in much the same way as other western countries. The relics of Saint Valentin de Terni, the patron of the St Valentine's Day, are in the Catholic church of Saint-Jean-Baptiste and Saint-Jean-l’Evangéliste located in the southern France town of Roquemaure, Gard. The celebrations of "Fête des Amoureux" takes place every two years on the Sunday closest to February 14. The village gets dressed in its 19th-century costume and put on the program with over 800 people.

Greece
St. Valentine's Day, or Ημέρα του Αγίου Βαλεντίνου in Greek tradition was not associated with romantic love. In the Eastern Orthodox church there is another Saint who protects people who are in love, Hyacinth of Caesarea (feast day July 3), but this was not widely known until the late 1990s. In contemporary Greece, Valentine's Day is generally celebrated as in the common Western tradition.

Ireland

On Saint Valentine's Day in Ireland, many individuals who seek true love make a Christian pilgrimage to the Shrine of St. Valentine in Whitefriar Street Carmelite Church in Dublin, which is said to house relics of Saint Valentine of Rome; they pray at the shrine in hope of finding romance. There lies a book in which foreigners and locals have written their prayer requests for love.

Poland 
Saint Valentine's Day was introduced to Poland together with the cult of Saint Valentine via Bavaria and Tyrol. However, it rose in popularity in the 1990s. The only (and the biggest) public celebration in Poland is held annually from 2002 in Chełmno under the name „Walentynki Chełmińskie” (Chełmno Valentine's). Because Chełmno's parish church of the Assumption of the Blessed Virgin Mary has been holding the relic of St. Valentine since the Middle Ages, local cult of the saint has been combined with the Anglo-Saxon tradition.

Portugal
In Portugal, the holiday is known as "Dia dos Namorados" (Lover's Day / Day of the Enamoured). As elsewhere, couples exchange gifts, but in some regions, women give a lenço de namorados ("lovers' handkerchief"), which is usually embroidered with love motifs.

Romania
In recent years, Romania has also started celebrating Valentine's Day. This has drawn backlash from several groups, institutions, and nationalist organizations like Noua Dreaptǎ, who condemn Valentine's Day for being superficial, commercialist, and imported Western kitsch. In order to counter the perceived denaturation of national culture, Dragobete, a spring festival celebrated in parts of Southern Romania, has been rekindled after having been ignored during the Communist years as the traditional Romanian holiday for lovers. The holiday is named after a character from Romanian folklore who was supposed to be the son of Baba Dochia. Its date used to vary depending on the geographical area, however nowadays it is commonly observed on February 24.

Scandinavia
In Denmark and Norway, February 14 is known as Valentinsdag, and is celebrated in much the same manner as in the United Kingdom. In Sweden it is called Alla hjärtans dag ("All Hearts' Day") but is not widely celebrated. A 2016 survey revealed that less than 50% of men and women were planning to buy presents for their partners. The holiday has only been observed since the 1960s.

Spain
The holiday was first introduced in Spain through a 1948 advertisement campaign by the department store chain Galerías Preciados, and had become widespread by the 1970s.

Known as "San Valentín", the holiday is celebrated the same way as in the rest of the West.

United Kingdom

In the UK, just under half of the population spends money on their Valentines and around £1.3 billion is spent yearly on cards, flowers, chocolates, and other gifts, with an estimated 25 million cards being sent.

In Wales, some people celebrate Dydd Santes Dwynwen (St. Dwynwen's Day) on January 25 instead of (or as well as) Valentine's Day. The day commemorates St Dwynwen, the Welsh patron saint of love. The Welsh name for Saint Valentine is Sant Ffolant.

In a 2016 poll conducted by Channel 4 for Valentine's Day, Jane Austen's line, "My heart is, and always will be, yours", from her novel Sense and Sensibility as said by Edward Ferrars (Hugh Grant) to Elinor Dashwood (Emma Thompson) in the acclaimed 1995 film adaptation, was voted the most romantic line from literature, film, and TV by thousands of women.

Restrictions on Valentine's day in some countries
The celebration of Valentine's Day has been banned in Indonesia, Pakistan, and Saudi Arabia due to beliefs the holiday conflicts with Islamic culture. 

Since 2009, certain practices pertaining to Valentine's Day (such as giving flowers, cards, or other gifts suggestive of Valentine's Day) are banned in Iran. Iran's Law Enforcement Force prosecutes distributors of goods with symbols associated with Valentine's Day. In 2021, the Prosecutor's Office of Qom, Iran, stated that it will prosecute those who disseminate and provide anti-cultural symbols like those of Valentine's Day. Although Valentine's Day is not accepted or approved by any institution in Iran and has no official status, it is highly accepted among a large part of the population. One of the reasons for Valentine's Day acceptance since the 2000s by the general population is the change in relations between the sexes, and because sexual relationship are no longer strictly limited to be within marriage.

See also 

 World Kiss Day
 Dia dos Namorados
 Sailor's valentine
 Saint Valentine's Day Massacre
 Singles Awareness Day
 Steak and Blowjob Day
 Valentine's Day (2010 film)
 V-Day, the global movement to end violence against women and girls.
 Women's Memorial March, held on Valentine's Day in Vancouver, British Columbia.
 Cake and Cunnilingus Day

Notes

References

Bibliography

Further reading

External links

 
 

 
Love
International observances
February observances
Days celebrating love
Valentine